Little Red Riding Hood is a 1922 short animated film by Walt Disney that is a rendition of the traditional story of Little Red Riding Hood. The film is part of the Laugh-O-Grams series that was released in 1922. This is one of the first ever cartoons by Disney, and considered Disney's first attempt at animated storytelling. Rather than using animation cels, it was made mostly by photographing inked lines on paper. The film was considered to be lost for many years and it was listed in 1980 on the American Film Institute's "10 Most Wanted Films for Archival Preservation". A print of the film was discovered by British collector David Wyatt in a London film library in 1998 and was restored the same year.

The film introduces the first appearance of Julius the Cat, who would become Disney's first named, recurring character. Julius would last appear in Alice the Beach Nut.
A second American short film with the same title was also released in 1922 which starred Baby Peggy.

See also
 List of rediscovered films

References

External links
 
 
 Fairy Tale Flappers: Animated Adaptations of Little Red and Cinderella (1922-1925)

1922 short films
1922 animated films
1922 films
1920s Disney animated short films
Films based on Little Red Riding Hood
Films directed by Walt Disney
Films produced by Walt Disney
Articles containing video clips
1920s rediscovered films
Laugh-O-Gram Studio films
American black-and-white films
American silent short films
Rediscovered American films
1920s American animated films